Vesela Dolyna is a village in Bolhrad Raion, Odesa Oblast (province) of Ukraine. It belongs to Borodino settlement hromada, one of the hromadas of Ukraine. 

Until 18 July 2020, Vesela Dolyna was located in Tarutyne Raion. The raion was abolished in July 2020 as part of the administrative reform of Ukraine, which reduced the number of raions of Odesa Oblast to seven. The area of Tarutyne Raion was merged into Bolhrad Raion.

Notable people
Stepan Poltorak (born 1965), general, Minister of Defense (2014–2019)

References

Notes

Villages in Bolhrad Raion